Charles Pierre Vézina (June 29, 1885 – July 24, 1944) was a Canadian professional ice hockey player. He played with the Montreal Canadiens of the National Hockey Association in the 1911–12 season, appearing in one game and going scoreless. He was the brother of Georges Vézina.

References

1885 births
1944 deaths
Canadian ice hockey players
Ice hockey people from Quebec
Montreal Canadiens (NHA) players
Sportspeople from Saguenay, Quebec